Val Belcher (July 6, 1954 – September 12, 2010) was an American football offensive guard in the Canadian Football League (CFL) for the Ottawa Rough Riders and the Winnipeg Blue Bombers. He played college football at the University of Houston and was drafted in the third round of the 1977 NFL Draft by the Dallas Cowboys of the National Football League (NFL).

Early years
Belcher attended Reagan High School, before moving on to the University of Houston. He was a three-year starter, that began his career playing offensive guard, before moving to offensive tackle as a senior. He was a part of the 1976 SWC championship team, receiving All-SWC and honorable mention All-American honors at the end of the season.

Professional career

Dallas Cowboys
Belcher was drafted by the Dallas Cowboys in the third round (81st overall) of the 1977 NFL Draft to play offensive guard. He was waived on August 30, 1977.

Ottawa Rough Riders (CFL)
In 1979, he signed with the Ottawa Rough Riders where he became a starter at right guard, a three-time East All-Star and a CFL All-Star (1980, 1981, 1982). He also was nominated three times for Most Outstanding Offensive lineman (1979, 1980, 1981). On July 21, 1983, he was the traded to the Winnipeg Blue Bombers.

Winnipeg Blue Bombers (CFL)
He played for the Winnipeg Blue Bombers for two more seasons, before retiring in November 1984, after the team won the Grey Cup.

Personal life
Following his retirement from professional football, Belcher began a highly successful career as a restaurant entrepreneur. In 1986, he founded the Lone Star Cafe restaurant with former Ottawa Rough Rider teammate Larry Brune in the Ottawa suburb of Nepean. Over the years, it expanded into a franchise business. It was renamed Lone Star Texas Grill, operating under the Lone Star Group of Companies. As of 2020, Lone Star Texas Grill operates over 20 locations across southern and eastern Ontario, including seven in the Greater Ottawa Area where it originated, as a family-style restaurant specializing in wood-fire grill fajitas, authentic Tex-Mex fare and frozen margaritas. In 2008, he opened a new restaurant, Big Easy’s Seafood & Steak House, in Ottawa (since closed).

Belcher died September 12, 2010 at the age of 56. He died from congestive heart failure while waiting for a heart transplant at the Ottawa Heart Institute. He was survived by his three children (Layne, Ashton and Meagan) and his life partner, Leslie Hines.

References

External links
Rider, restaurateur Val Belcher dies

1954 births
2010 deaths
Canadian football offensive linemen
Ottawa Rough Riders players
Winnipeg Blue Bombers players
Houston Cougars football players
Players of Canadian football from Houston
Players of American football from Houston
Dallas Cowboys players